Anomisma is a genus of damselflies in the family Pseudostigmatidae. There is at least one described species in Anomisma, A. abnorme.

References

Further reading

 
 
 
 
 
 
 

Damselflies